Nenante Nene is a 1968 Indian Telugu-language masala film directed by V. Ramachandra Rao and produced by P. N. Babji. A remake of the 1967 Tamil film Naan, it stars Krishna, Kanchana, Krishnam Raju and Nagabhushanam. The film focuses on a Raja's failed attempt to find his lost son, and three men who claim to be the lost son, seeking rights to the Raja's properties. Nenante Nene was released on 6 September 1968 and became commercially successful.

Plot 
Rajkumar is the son of the Raja of Rangapuram. Annoyed by his father's feudalistic attitude, he flees to Rangoon where he is raised by a woman named Kamakshi. Years later, before dying, the Raja gives the job of finding his lost son to his three friends and his diwan, along with clues for identifying him. Three men – Anand, Ravi and Bhushanam – arrive at the Raja's palace and claim to be Rajkumar, seeking rights to the Raja's properties.

Kamakshi is brought in to identify the real Rajkumar. Under duress, she testifies to her own son Anand as Rajkumar. Meanwhile, Ravi falls in love with Geetha, the diwans daughter. It is later revealed that Bhushanam is a CID officer trying to capture an underworld don who Anand works for. Ravi enacts a drama to save the real Rajkumar, who is in love with Ravi's sister Sarala. The film ends with Rajkumar being rescued and the culprits captured.

Cast 
Adapted from The Hindu:

Production 
Nenante Nene, a remake of the 1967 Tamil film Naan, was directed by V. Ramachandra Rao and produced by P. N. Babji under Sujatha Films. The dialogues were written by Bhamidipati Radhakrishna, who largely followed the original Tamil dialogues written by T. N. Balu while making some improvisations. Ramachandra Rao also wrote the film's screenplay, largely following the original Tamil version but making some changes, such as basing the character Kamakshi in Rangoon, unlike the original version where she was based in Colombo. Sriranjani Jr. reprised this role from Naan.

Krishnam Raju was initially reluctant to play the negative role of Anand, having debuted in a heroic role in Chilaka Gorinka (1966), until Babji's brother Doondy advised him to accept the role as he needed to portray diverse characters to build a career in cinema. After industry elders and Krishnam Raju's friends, including cast member Krishna shared this view, he accepted the role. Cinematography was handled by S. Venkat Ratnam, and the editing by N. S. Prakasam. The film was prominently shot at Vauhini Studios. It was N. Srinivas' first film as an independent dance choreographer; in previous films, he assisted Hiralal.

Soundtrack 
The soundtrack was composed by S. P. Kodandapani. Songs like "O Chinnadhana Nannu Vidichi", "Oke Oka Gulabipai Valina Thummedha" and "Narasinga Saminira" attained popularity.

Release 
Nenante Nene was released on 6 September 1968 and was commercially successful.

See also 
 Waris, the Hindi remake of Naan

References

External links 
 

1960s masala films
1960s Telugu-language films
Films directed by V. Ramachandra Rao
Telugu remakes of Tamil films
Films scored by S. P. Kodandapani